The 1995–96 Kansas Jayhawks men's basketball team represented the University of Kansas in the 1995–96 NCAA Division I men's basketball season, which was the Jayhawks' 98th basketball season. The head coach was Roy Williams, who served his 8th year at KU. The team played its home games in Allen Fieldhouse in Lawrence, Kansas. It was the Jayhawks final season in the Big Eight Conference, which dissolved at the end of the 1995–1996 school year.

Roster

Big Eight Conference standings

Schedule 

|-

|-

|-
!colspan=9| Big Eight Tournament

|-
!colspan=9| NCAA tournament

Rankings 

*There was no coaches poll in week 1.

References 

Kansas Jayhawks men's basketball seasons
Kansas
Jay
Jay
Kansas